Muktagachha is a town and municipality in Mymensingh District in the division of Mymensingh. It is the administrative centre and urban centre of Muktagachha Upazila.

References 

Populated places in Mymensingh Division
Towns in Bangladesh